Nowiniec  is a village in the administrative district of Gmina Lubsko, within Żary County, Lubusz Voivodeship, in western Poland.

References

Nowiniec